Brenda Archer (born 17 September 1942 in Georgetown, Demerara-Mahaica) is a retired female track and field athlete from Guyana. She competed in the high jump, and represented her native country at the 1960 Summer Olympics in Rome, Italy, finishing in 20th place.

References
sports-reference

1942 births
Living people
Sportspeople from Georgetown, Guyana
Guyanese female high jumpers
Athletes (track and field) at the 1960 Summer Olympics
Olympic athletes of British Guiana
Central American and Caribbean Games gold medalists for Guyana
Competitors at the 1962 Central American and Caribbean Games
Central American and Caribbean Games medalists in athletics